Antegnate is a comune (municipality) in the Province of Bergamo in the Italian region of Lombardy, located about  east of Milan and about  southeast of Bergamo.

Antegnate borders the following municipalities: Barbata, Calcio, Covo, Fontanella.

References

Articles which contain graphical timelines